"La Marseillaise" is the national anthem of France. The song was written in 1792 by Claude Joseph Rouget de Lisle in Strasbourg after the declaration of war by France against Austria, and was originally titled "Chant de guerre pour l'Armée du Rhin" ("War Song for the Army of the Rhine").

The French National Convention adopted it as the Republic's anthem in 1795. The song acquired its nickname after being sung in Paris by volunteers from Marseille marching to the capital. The song is the first example of the "European march" anthemic style. The anthem's evocative melody and lyrics have led to its widespread use as a song of revolution and its incorporation into many pieces of classical and popular music.

History 

As the French Revolution continued, the monarchies of Europe became concerned that revolutionary fervor would spread to their countries. The War of the First Coalition was an effort to stop the revolution, or at least contain it to France. Initially, the French army did not distinguish itself, and Coalition armies invaded France.  On 25 April 1792, Baron Philippe-Frédéric de Dietrich, the mayor of Strasbourg and worshipful master of the local masonic lodge, asked his freemason guest Rouget de Lisle to compose a song "that will rally our soldiers from all over to defend their homeland that is under threat". That evening, Rouget de Lisle wrote "Chant de guerre pour l'Armée du Rhin" (English: "War Song for the Army of the Rhine"), and dedicated the song to Marshal Nicolas Luckner, a Bavarian freemason in French service from Cham. A plaque on the building on Place Broglie where De Dietrich's house once stood commemorates the event. De Dietrich was executed the next year during the Reign of Terror.

The melody soon became the rallying call to the French Revolution and was adopted as "La Marseillaise" after the melody was first sung on the streets by volunteers (fédérés in French) from Marseille by the end of May. These fédérés were making their entrance into the city of Paris on 30 July 1792 after a young volunteer from Montpellier called François Mireur had sung it at a patriotic gathering in Marseille, and the troops adopted it as the marching song of the National Guard of Marseille. A newly graduated medical doctor, Mireur later became a general under Napoléon Bonaparte and died in Egypt at age 28.

The song's lyrics reflect the invasion of France by foreign armies (from Prussia and Austria) that was under way when it was written. Strasbourg itself was attacked just a few days later. The invading forces were repulsed from France following their defeat in the Battle of Valmy. As the vast majority of Alsatians did not speak French, a German version ("Auf, Brüder, auf dem Tag entgegen") was published in October 1792 in Colmar.

The Convention accepted it as the French national anthem in a decree passed on 14 July 1795, making it France's first anthem. It later lost this status under Napoleon I, and the song was banned outright by Louis XVIII and Charles X, being re-instated only briefly after the July Revolution of 1830. During Napoleon I's reign, "Veillons au salut de l'Empire" was the unofficial anthem of the regime, and in Napoleon III's reign, it was "Partant pour la Syrie", but the Government brought back the iconic anthem in an attempt to motivate the French people during the Franco-Prussian War. During the nineteenth and early twentieth centuries, "La Marseillaise" was recognised as the anthem of the international revolutionary movement; as such, it was adopted by the Paris Commune in 1871, albeit with new lyrics under the title "La marseillaise de la Commune". Eight years later, in 1879, it was restored as France's national anthem, and has remained so ever since.

Music 
Several musical antecedents have been cited for the melody:

 Tema e variazioni in Do maggiore, a work by the Italian violinist Giovanni Battista Viotti (composed in 1781); the dating of the manuscript has been questioned.
 Wolfgang Amadeus Mozart's Allegro maestoso from the Piano Concerto No. 25 (composed in 1786).
 The oratorio Esther by Jean Baptiste Lucien Grison (composed in 1787).

Other attributions (the credo of the fourth mass of Holtzmann of Mursberg) have been refuted.

Rouget de Lisle himself never signed the score of "La Marseillaise".

Cultural impact and musical adaptations 

"La Marseillaise" was arranged for soprano, chorus and orchestra by Hector Berlioz in about 1830.

Franz Liszt wrote a piano transcription of the anthem.

During World War I, bandleader James Reese Europe played a jazz version of "La Marseillaise".

Adaptations in other musical works 
 Dmitri Shostakovich quotes "La Marseillaise" at some length during the fifth reel of the film score he composed for the 1929 silent movie The New Babylon (set during the Paris Commune), where it is juxtaposed contrapuntally with the famous "Infernal Galop" from Offenbach's Orpheus in the Underworld.
 Pyotr Ilyich Tchaikovsky quotes "La Marseillaise" in his 1812 Overture, representing the invading French Army under Napoleon (although it had not been the French national anthem at that time), and it is drowned out by cannon fire, symbolizing the Russian victory at the Battle of Borodino.
 Claude Balbastre wrote a set of variations for keyboard on this theme which was dedicated "by citizen C. Balbastre to the brave defenders of the French Republic, 1792, first year of the republic".
François-Joseph Gossec used the theme extensively throughout his Offrande à la Liberté ou 'La Marseillaise'''.
Franz Metzger, a composer almost entirely forgotten nowadays, quotes it in his La Bataille de Fleurus (a "battle piece" written after the Battle of Fleurus). 
 Claude Debussy quotes fragments of "La Marseillaise" in two of his piano works: the closing bars of Feux d'artifice, the last piece in the second book of his Préludes for piano solo, composed in 1913; and the second movement Lent. Sombre in the two-piano suite En blanc et noir, composed in 1915 during World War I, and prefaced by verses from François Villon's "Ballade contre les ennemis de la France".
 László Lajtha quoted fragments of "La Marseillaise" in the third movement of his Symphony No. 7 Revolution/Autumn, composed in 1957 after the Hungarian Revolution.
 The Beatles hit single of 1967, "All You Need Is Love", uses the opening bars of "La Marseillaise" as an introduction.
 On Simchat Torah (18–19 October) 1973, the Lubavitcher Rebbe adapted the melody to the Jewish prayer "HaAderet v'HaEmunah". In Chabad, the melody is believed to convey the idea of a "spiritual French revolution" – in that Torah should be spread around the world as an advent to the messianic era.
 Sarah Schachner used and reinterpreted the melody of "La Marseillaise" in the track "Rather Death Than Slavery" that is included in the official soundtrack to the video game Assassin's Creed Unity, itself set during the French Revolution. This track was also later used in a trailer for season 5 of the TV drama Game of Thrones.

 Notable use in other media 

The movie Casablanca (1942) features a scene where the German, Major Strasser, leads a group of officers in singing "Die Wacht am Rhein" ("The Watch on the Rhine"). The Resistance leader, Victor Laszlo, orders the house band to play "La Marseillaise". When the band looks to the owner Rick, he nods his head. Laszlo starts singing, alone at first, then patriotic fervor grips the crowd and everyone joins in, drowning out the Germans as the entire tavern sings "La Marseillaise".  A similar scene had been featured in Jean Renoir's La Grande Illusion (1937).

 Historical Russian use 
In Russia, "La Marseillaise" was used as a republican revolutionary anthem by those who knew French starting in the 18th century, almost simultaneously with its adoption in France. In 1875 Peter Lavrov, a narodnik revolutionary and theorist, wrote a Russian-language text (not a translation of the French one) to the same melody. This "Worker's Marseillaise" became one of the most popular revolutionary songs in Russia and was used in the Revolution of 1905. After the February Revolution of 1917, it was used as the semi-official national anthem of the new Russian republic. Even after the October Revolution, it remained in use for a while alongside "The Internationale".

 Criticism 
The English philosopher and reformer Jeremy Bentham, who was declared an honorary citizen of France in 1791 in recognition of his sympathies for the ideals of the French Revolution, was not enamoured of "La Marseillaise". Contrasting its qualities with the "beauty" and "simplicity" of "God Save the King", he wrote in 1796:

The War whoop of anarchy, the Marseillais Hymn, is to my ear, I must confess, independently of all moral association, a most dismal, flat, and unpleasing ditty: and to any ear it is at any rate a long winded and complicated one. In the instance of a melody so mischievous in its application, it is a fortunate incident, if, in itself, it should be doomed neither in point of universality, nor permanence, to gain equal hold on the affections of the people.

Valéry Giscard d'Estaing who was President of France for most of the 1970s, said that it is ridiculous to sing about drenching French fields with impure Prussian blood as a  Chancellor of the modern democratic Germany takes the salute in Paris. A 1992 campaign to change the words of the song involving more than 100 prominent French citizens, including Danielle Mitterrand, wife of then-President François Mitterrand, was unsuccessful.

The British historian Simon Schama discussed "La Marseillaise" on BBC Radio 4's Today'' programme on 17 November 2015 (in the immediate aftermath of the Paris attacks), saying it was "... the great example of courage and solidarity when facing danger; that's why it is so invigorating, that's why it really is the greatest national anthem in the world, ever. Most national anthems are pompous, brassy, ceremonious, but this is genuinely thrilling. Very important in the song ... is the line 'before us is tyranny, the bloody standard of tyranny has risen'. There is no more ferocious tyranny right now than ISIS, so it's extremely easy for the tragically and desperately grieving French to identify with that".

See also 

 "Belarusian Marseillaise", a patriotic song in Belarus
 "Ça Ira", another famous anthem of the French Revolution
 "Chant du départ", the official anthem of the Napoleonic Empire
 "La Marseillaise des Blancs", the Royal and Catholic variation
 "Marche Henri IV", the national anthem of the Kingdom of France
 "Onamo", a Montenegrin patriotic song popularly known as the "Serbian Marseillaise"
 "The Women's Marseillaise", a women's suffrage protest song
 "Worker's Marseillaise", the national anthem of Russia from 1917 to 1918; written by Robert Schumann, and based on "La Marseillaise"

Explanatory notes

References

Further reading

External links 

 
 
 
 
 La Marseillaise, Iain Patterson's comprehensive website

 
1792 compositions
Articles containing video clips
European anthems
French anthems
French military marches
French patriotic songs
National anthem compositions in B-flat major
National anthem compositions in G major
National anthems
National symbols of France
North American anthems
Oceanian anthems
Songs of the French Revolution
South American anthems
World Digital Library